Bruce Dickinson, a British heavy metal singer, has released six studio albums, two live albums, one compilation, ten singles, three video albums, fourteen music videos, and one box set. In 1979, after playing in local groups, Dickinson joined hard rock band Samson. He departed after two years to become Iron Maiden's lead vocalist. His debut with this band is considered a "masterpiece", which was followed with a series of top-ten releases. In 1989, while Iron Maiden were taking a year off, Dickinson and former Gillan guitarist, Janick Gers, composed a song for a film soundtrack. His solo debut, Tattooed Millionaire (1990), was an effort that favoured a hard rock/pop metal approach, different from what fans assumed would be an aggressive, Iron Maiden-like album. Four songs—the title track, "Dive! Dive! Dive!", "Born in '58", and a cover version of David Bowie's "All the Young Dudes"—were released as singles. Dickinson returned to Iron Maiden, accompanied by Gers as the new guitarist, and the project went on hiatus. Dive! Dive! Live! was a live video recorded from a concert in Los Angeles, California, in August 1990, and released in July 1991.

After a farewell tour in 1993, Dickinson left Iron Maiden and started working on a second album with Tribe of Gypsies guitarist and band leader, Roy Z. In June 1994, he released Balls to Picasso, which reached the top 30 in several countries. Allmusic deemed the album "somewhat of a disappointment" which failed to "come up with anything truly groundbreaking", except for "Tears of the Dragon", which was released as a single, along with "Shoot All the Clowns". Roy Z departed to continue with his work and Dickinson recruited new members, with whom he released the double-disc live performance, Alive in Studio A. The third album, Skunkworks, was released in 1996, marking a "highly approved stylistic shift". The single "Back from the Edge" was released to promote this effort. A live video and an EP were recorded from a concert in Spain, and released in Japan, as Skunkworks Live.

Due to musical differences, the Skunkworks line-up split up, and Dickinson once again was joined by Roy Z, along with then ex-Iron Maiden guitarist, Adrian Smith. The follow-up album, Accident of Birth (1997), marked a return to a heavier sound for Dickinson. The title track and "Man of Sorrows" were released as singles. The next year he released a semi-concept album on alchemy, The Chemical Wedding, which was described as a "modern metal aesthetic". The "muscular anthem", "Killing Floor", was the album's single. The live album, Scream for Me Brazil, documented a 1999 live performance in São Paulo during the supporting tour. That year, Dickinson and Smith rejoined Iron Maiden, and the project once again went on hiatus. He released a "best of…" album in 2001, which included two new songs, "Broken" and "Silver Wings". On 23 May 2005, Dickinson released his first album in seven years, Tyranny of Souls. To commemorate this, all of his past releases were remastered, with his studio efforts containing bonus tracks, and the live recordings merged into a single box set, entitled Alive. The 2006 DVD, Anthology, contained three live performances, all of the promo videos, and over an hour of extras.

Albums

Studio albums

Live albums

Compilation albums

Singles

Video albums

Music videos

Box sets

Other appearances

See also
Iron Maiden discography
Samson discography

References
General

 
 
 
 

Specific

External links
Bruce Dickinson's official website

Discography
Heavy metal discographies
Discographies of British artists